The Mississippi Republican Party is the Mississippi state affiliate of the United States Republican Party. The party chairman is Frank Bordeaux, and the party is based in Jackson, Mississippi. The original Republican Party of Mississippi was founded following the American Civil War, and the current incarnation of the Mississippi Republican Party was founded in 1956. The party would grow in popularity after the 1964 Civil Rights Act and is currently the dominant party in the state.

History

In 1956, Wirt Adams Yerger, Jr., an insurance agent from Jackson, founded the modern Mississippi Republican Party and served as the first state chairman from 1956 until 1966. He was chairman of the Mississippi delegation to the Republican National Convention in 1956, 1960, and 1964. He was elected to a four-year term as chairman of the Southern Association of Republican State Chairman in 1960.  In 2009, the central committee of the Mississippi Republican Party named Yerger Chairman Emeritus.  The Mississippi Republican Party would grow in supporters with then President Dwight D. Eisenhower, who still twice lost the electoral votes of Mississippi. On September 24, 1960, Republican presidential candidate Richard Nixon campaigned in the state, the first time a presidential candidate had appeared in the state in more than a century. During the 1964 Republican National Convention Mississippi delegates would help nominate Barry Goldwater for President.  Goldwater would go on to win 87 percent of the vote in Mississippi in the 1964 presidential election, the first time a Republican would win the state since the Reconstruction Era.  Only once since 1956 has a non-Republican presidential candidate won the state of Mississippi, Jimmy Carter in the 1976 presidential election.  In 1988, Republican Congressman Trent Lott would defeat Democratic Congressman Wayne Dowdy to replace retiring Senator  John Stennis (D-MS).

Gubernatorial elections

In 1963, Rubel Phillips became the first Republican nominee for governor in 80 years, challenging then-Lt. Gov. Paul Johnson, Jr. and garnering 38 percent of the vote.  Phillips ran again in 1967 against John Bell Williams but lost again, this time earning 29 percent of the vote.  In 1991, for the first time in over a century a Republican would become the Governor of Mississippi, when Kirk Fordice would earn 50.8 percent of the popular vote, defeating Democrat Ray Mabus.  In the 2003 Mississippi Gubernatorial Election, Haley Barbour defeated then incumbent Democrat Ronnie Musgrove with 52.59% of the vote. On November 5, 2019, Tate Reeves was elected Governor of Mississippi and assumed office in January 2020.

Policy positions
While Mississippi Republicans take positions on a wide variety of issues, some of the noteworthy ones include:
 Abortion - "Protecting and securing the 'life, liberty, and property' of Mississippians begins first with guarding the life of the unborn child. Our policies should honor the sanctity of innocent human life."  In November 2011, Governor Haley Barbour voted for Mississippi Initiative 26.  Initiative #26 would amend the Mississippi Constitution to define the word "person" or "persons", as those terms are used in Article III of the state constitution, to include every human being from the moment of fertilization, cloning, or the functional equivalent thereof.
 Voting rights - In January 2009, Republican Senator Joey Fillingane put forward Mississippi Initiative 27 which would amend the Mississippi Constitution to require voters to submit a government issued photo identification before being allowed to vote. This initiative passed on November 8, 2011.
 Private property - Republican Party members supported Mississippi Initiative 31 on the topic of eminent domain. Initiative #31 would amend the Mississippi Constitution to prohibit state and local government from taking private property by eminent domain and then conveying it to other persons or private businesses for a period of 10 years after acquisition.

Current Republican officeholders
The Mississippi Republican Party hold all the eight statewide offices and holds a majority in the Mississippi Senate. Republicans also hold both of the state's U.S. Senate seats and 3 of the state's 4 U.S. House seats.

Members of Congress

U.S. Senate

U.S. House of Representatives

Statewide offices
Governor: Tate Reeves
Lieutenant Governor: Delbert Hosemann
Attorney General: Lynn Fitch
Secretary of State: Michael Watson
State Auditor: Shad White
State Treasurer: David McRae
Commissioner of Agriculture and Commerce: Andy Gipson
Commissioner of Insurance: Mike Chaney

State Legislative Leadership
President of the Senate: Delbert Hosemann
Speaker of the House: Philip Gunn

Mississippi State Republican chairmen

Wirt Yerger, 1956-1966
Clarke Reed, 1966-1976
Charles W. Pickering, 1976-1978
Michael Retzer, 1978-1982; 1996-2001
Evelyn McPhail, 1987-1992
Jim Herring, 2001-2008
 Brad White, 2008-2011
 Arnie Hederman, 2011
Joe Nosef, 2012-2017
Lucien Smith, 2017–2020
 Frank Bordeaux, 2020–present

See also

 Mississippi Democratic Party
 Lewis McAllister, first Republican member of the Mississippi House of Representatives since Reconstruction, 1962–1968, from Meridian
 Seelig Wise, first Republican state senator since Reconstruction, served 1964-1968 (Coahoma, Tunica, and Quitman counties)

References

External links
Mississippi Republican Party

1956 establishments in Mississippi
Political parties established in 1956
Republican Party
Republican Party (United States) by state